Old Eastaboga is an unincorporated community in Talladega County, Alabama, United States. Eastaboga (historically Estaboga) means "where the people reside" in Muscogee. Old Eastaboga was formerly called Eastaboga until the early 20th century, and was briefly listed as an incorporated town on the 1900 and 1910 censuses. The nearby former town of McFall, which was to the north along the railroad, straddling the Talladega and Calhoun County lines, was later renamed Eastaboga (while the original Eastaboga became Old Eastaboga).

Demographics

Eastaboga (spelled as "Estaboga") was listed on the 1900 and 1910 U.S. Censuses as an incorporated town wholly within Talladega County. It presumably incorporated at or prior to 1900. Given its rapid population decline by 1910, it likely lost its charter at some point during that decade.

Notable people
 Lewis Archer Boswell, aviation pioneer

References

Unincorporated communities in Talladega County, Alabama
Unincorporated communities in Alabama
Alabama placenames of Native American origin